C300 may refer to

 C300 Ground Refuel Vehicle, a USAF ground vehicle
 Canon C300, a professional Canon video camera
 Canal 300, a public television channel operated by Televisió de Catalunya in Catalonia
 Kodak EasyShare C300, a camera model
 Mercedes Benz C300 (C350), a car
 Pantech PG-C300, a camera phone advertised as "the world's smallest camera phone" (as of September 2006)